The Rann of Kutch (alternately spelled as Kuchchh) is a large area of salt marshes that span the border between India and Pakistan. It is located mostly in the Kutch district of the Indian state of Gujarat, with a minor portion extending into the Sindh province of Pakistan. It is divided into the Great Rann and Little Rann.

Geography
The Rann of Kutch is located mostly in the Indian state of Gujarat, specifically Kutch district, for which it is named. Some parts extend into the Pakistani province of Sindh. The word Rann means "desert".

The Rann of Kutch covers around 26,000 square kilometres (10,000 square miles). The Great Rann of Kutch is the larger portion of the Rann. It extends east and west, with the Thar Desert to the north and the low hills of Kutch to the south. The Indus River Delta lies to the west in southern Pakistan. The Little Rann of Kutch lies southeast of the Great Rann, and extends southwards to the Gulf of Kutch.

Many rivers originating in Rajasthan and Gujarat flow into the Rann of Kutch, including the Luni, Bhuki, Bharud, Nara, Kharod, Banas, Saraswati, Rupen, Bambhan, and Machchhu. Kori Creek and Sir Creek, tidal creeks which are part of the Indus River Delta, are located at the western end of the Great Rann.

The surface is generally flat and very close to sea level, and most of the Rann floods annually during the monsoon season. There are areas of sandy higher ground, known as bets or s, which lie two to three metres above flood level. Trees and shrubs grow on the bets, and they provide refuges for wildlife during the annual floods.

Climate
The climate of the ecoregion is subtropical. Temperatures average 44 °C during the hot summer months, and can reach highs of 50 °C. During the winter the temperature can drop to or below freezing.

Rainfall is highly seasonal. The Rann of Kutch is dry for most of the year, and rainfall is concentrated in the June to September monsoon season. During the monsoon season, local rainfall and river runoff flood much of the Rann to a depth of 0.5 metres. The waters evaporate during the long dry season, leaving the Rann dry again by the start of the next monsoon season.

Ecology

The Rann of Kutch is the only large flooded grasslands zone in the Indomalayan realm. The area has desert on one side and the sea on the other enables various ecosystems, including mangroves and desert vegetation. Its grassland and deserts are home to forms of wildlife that have adapted to its often harsh conditions. These include endemic and endangered animal and plant species.

Flora

The predominant vegetation in the Rann of Kutch is grassland and thorn scrub. Common grass species include Apluda aristata, Cenchrus spp., Pennisetum spp., Cymbopogon spp., Eragrostis spp., and Elionurus spp.

Trees are rare except on the bets which rise above the flood zone. The non-native tree Prosopis juliflora has become established on the bets, and its seed pods provide year-round food for the wild asses.

Fauna
The Rann of Kutch is home to about 50 species of mammals. They include several large herbivores, including Indian wild ass (Equus hemionus khur), chinkara (Gazella bennettii), nilgai (Boselaphus tragocamelus), and blackbuck (Antilope cervicapra), and the large predators wolf (Canis lupus), striped hyena (Hyaena hyaena), desert wildcat (Felis lybica), and caracal (Felis caracal). The Indian wild ass once had a wider distribution but is now limited to the Rann of Kutch. The nilgai and blackbuck are threatened species.

There are over 200 bird species in the Rann of Kutch, including the threatened species lesser florican (Sypheotides indicus) and houbara bustard (Chlamydotis undulata). The seasonal wetlands provide habitat for many water birds, including the demoiselle crane (Grus virgo) and lesser flamingo (Phoeniconaias minor).

History and culture
The history of the Rann of Kutch began with early neolithic settlements. It was later inhabited by the Indus Valley civilization as well as the Maurya and Gupta empires of India.

Indus Valley Period

The people of the Indus civilization appear to have settled in the Rann of Kutch around 3500 BCE. The Indus city of Dholavira, the largest Indus site in India, is located in the Rann of Kutch. This city was built on the Tropic of Cancer, possibly indicating that Dholavira's inhabitants were skilled in astronomy. The Rann of Kutch also contained the industrial site of Khirasara, where a warehouse was found.

Many Indologists such as A. S. Gaur and Mani Murali hold the view that the Rann of Kutch was, rather than the salt marsh that it is today, a navigable archipelago at the time of the Indus Civilization. The Indus Civilization was known to have an extensive maritime trade system, so it has been proposed by Gaur et al. that there were perhaps ports in the Rann of Kutch.

Imperial Indian Period
The Rann of Kutch was a part of both the Maurya and Gupta empires of India.

Colonial and Modern periods

The Rann of Kutch came under the control of the British Raj, who imposed a ban on salt harvesting. This ban was protested and overturned by Indian activist Mahatma Gandhi. More recently, the residents of the Rann of Kutch began holding the Rann Utsav festival, a three-month long carnival, which marks the peak tourist season.

Conservation and protected areas
A 2017 assessment found that 20,946 km2, or 76%, of the ecoregion is in protected areas. They include the Kutch Desert Wildlife Sanctuary (7506.22 km2), which was established in 1986 and covers much of the Great Rann, and the Indian Wild Ass Sanctuary (4953.71 km2), which was established in 1973 and covers much of the Little Rann. Pakistan's Rann of Kutch Wildlife Sanctuary protects the northern portion of the Great Rann and adjacent Thar Desert.

References

External links

"Quick run to the Rann". Rann of Kutch, TPTC Blog

Global Species : Ecoregion : Rann of Kutch seasonal salt marsh
Rann Utsav 2022-2023 - Kuch Tour Guide

Indomalayan ecoregions
Flooded grasslands and savannas
Ecoregions of India
Ecoregions of Asia
Ecoregions of Pakistan
Geography of Kutch district
Geography of Sindh